Christopher Theisen (born 13 June 1993) is a German professional footballer who plays as a midfielder for Viktoria Berlin.

References

External links
 

Living people
1993 births
German footballers
Association football midfielders
3. Liga players
Regionalliga players
TuS Mayen players
SC Fortuna Köln players
1. FC Nürnberg II players
FC 08 Homburg players
FC Viktoria 1889 Berlin players